o1 is the first studio album by Hiroyuki Sawano's vocal project SawanoHiroyuki[nZk]. It was released on September 9, 2015 on SME Records. o1 was preceded by the singles "A/Z", "aLIEz", "&Z", "X.U." and "scaPEGoat".

The album charted #7 daily rank for first week. It charted so far 11 weeks in the Oricon charts.

Background
"A/Z" was used in the anime television series "Aldnoah.Zero" as the first ending theme, while "aLIEz" was used as the second ending theme. "&Z" was used in Aldnoah Zero's  second season as the opening theme.

"X.U." was used as the opening theme for the anime television series "Seraph of the End", while "scaPEGoat" was used as the ending theme.

Track listing

Credits 
Adapted from Booklet.
Production
Hiroyuki Sawano – arranger, producer, programming
Yasushi Horiguchi – director, executive producer
Daisuke Katsurada – executive producer
Mitsunori Aizawa – recording, mixing engineer & Pro Tools operator
Sho Suzuki – assistant engineer
Seiya Kawagoe – assistant engineer
Eriko Ijima – assistant engineer
Sora Tamiya – assistant engineer
Yuji Chinone – mastering
Giottographica – art direction & design
Michito Goto – photographer
Aya Murakami – hair & make-up
Tatsuhiko Marumoto – styling
Yuko Mori – products coordination
Toru Takeuchi – a&r
Takeshi Tomaru – a&r
Harumi Okuma – a&r assistant
SME Records Promotion Room – media promotion
Yu Tsuzuki – sales promotion
Mitsuki Hirabayashi – digital promotion
Keiichi Tonomura – supervise

Management Staff

Hiroyuki Sawano:
Akiko Shimodoi
Hajime Sakai
Aimer:
Yasuhisa Ichikawa
Mami Fujino
Yosh (Survive Said the Prophet):
Hayato Taguchi
mizuki:
Yoshiki Konno
Vocals
v[nZk]v – vocals (track 1)
Mica Caldito – vocals (tracks 2, 11)
Gemie – vocals (tracks 2,3, 8)
mizuki – vocals (tracks 4, 6, 9, 12)
Yosh Morita – vocals (tracks 5, 10)
Aimer – vocals (tracks 7, 13)
Instruments
Hiroyuki Sawano – piano (#1-5, 7-14), keyboards (#1-6, 8-13), all other instruments (all tracks) 
Yu "masshoi" Yamauchi – drums (tracks 1-5, 7-13)
Hiroshi Iimuro – guitar (tracks 1, 3, 5, 9, 10, 12)
Masayoshi Furukawa – guitar (tracks 3, 5)
Tetsuro Toyama – guitar (track 4)
Toshino Tanabe – bass (tracks 1-13)
Daisensei Muroya Strings – strings (tracks 7, 8)
Koichiro Muroya – violin (track 1)
Harutoshi Ito – cello (tracks 1, 7, 14), guitar (tracks 1, 2, 6, 7, 8, 11, 13)

References 

Hiroyuki Sawano albums
2015 albums